First Lady of Tunisia (French: Première dame de Tunisie) usually refers to the wife of the president of Tunisia. They often play a protocol role at the Carthage Palace and during official visits, though possess no official title. Ichraf Saied is the spouse of the current president, Kais Saied, who took office on 23 October 2019. It is not a public office nor an official title.

First ladies of Tunisia

References

Tunisia
Politics of Tunisia
Presidents of Tunisia